Cosita linda is a Spanish-language telenovela produced by Carlos Sotomayor and Peter Tinoco, and adapted by Nora Castillo for Venevisión and Univisión. It is distributed internationally by Venevisión International and Cisneros Media Distribution. It is a remake of the telenovela Cosita rica created in 2003 by Leonardo Padrón.

The series stars Christian Meier as Diego, Pedro Moreno as Olegario, Zuleyka Rivera as Viviana, Carolina Tejera as Tiffany, Ana Lorena Sánchez as Ana Lorena, Scarlet Gruber as Maria José and Mariana and Adrián Di Monte as Santiago.

Plot 
Luján families and Rincón live in different worlds; the Luján live a life of privilege, enjoying the benefits of their economic status; while the Rincón are a middle, simple working class. The fate join Diego Luján and Ana Rincón and their families in the process.

Cast

Main 
 Christian Meier as Diego Luján
 Ana Lorena Sánchez as Ana Lorena Rincón
 Pedro Moreno as Olegario Pérez
 Zuleyka Rivera as Viviana Robles
 Carolina Tejera as Tiffany Robles
 Scarlet Gruber as Maria José Luján / Mariana Vargas 
 Adrián Di Monte as Santiago Rincón

Recurring 
 Alma Delfina as Doña Santa
 Anna Silvetti as Consuelo Pérez
 Alfredo Huereca as Don Lupe Rincón
 Alberto Salaberry as Vicente Durán
 Cristina Bernal as Palmira Arroyo
 Mariet Rodríguez as Laura
 Ana Sobero as Prudencia Vargas
 Norma Zúñiga as Ramona
 Liliana Rodriguez as Camila "La Chata"
 Xavier Coronel as Raúl Yáñez
 Mijail Mulkay as Lisandro Gómez
 Franklin Virguez as Darío Núñez
 Sandra Itzel as Maya
 Emeraude Toubia as Dulce Rincón
 Patricio Gallardo as Nicolás
 Ana Belén Lander as Deborah "Debbie" Durán
 Gisella Aboumrad as Carmela
 Juan Carlos Flores as El Pelón
 Tali Duclaud as Romina
 Danilo Carrera as Federico "Fede" Madariaga
 Jason Canela as José Carlos Merina "El Cacho"

Guest stars 
 Henry Zakka as Narciso Luján
 Eva Tamargo as Telma Luján
 Mauricio Mejía as Alejandro "Alex" Casteló
 Carlos Garín as Gastón de la Peña

References

External links
 

2014 telenovelas
2014 Venezuelan television series debuts
Spanish-language American telenovelas
Univision telenovelas
Venezuelan telenovelas
Venevisión telenovelas
2014 Venezuelan television series endings
2015 American television series debuts
2016 American television series endings
American telenovelas
American television series based on Venezuelan television series